Events in the year 1834 in Belgium.

Incumbents

 Monarch: Leopold I
 Prime Minister: Albert Joseph Goblet d'Alviella (to 4 August), Barthélémy de Theux de Meylandt (from 4 August)

Events
1 May – Belgian State Railways established.
25 May – Convention between Belgium and Denmark on rights to inherit and acquire property comes into effect.
27 May – Diocese of Bruges re-established, with Franciscus Renatus Boussen as bishop
1 June – Work begins on first Belgian railway line.
10 June – Belgian bishops announce plans to establish a Catholic University (later to become Catholic University of Leuven).
25 June – Masonic lodge Les Amis Philanthropes announces plans to establish a secularist university (to become the Université libre de Bruxelles).
22 July – Commission royale d'Histoire founded.
22 September – Treaty of amity, commerce and navigation with the Empire of Brazil signed in Rio de Janeiro.
1 November – Postal convention with the United Kingdom of Great Britain and Ireland comes into effect.
8 November – Opening of the Catholic University of Belgium in Mechelen.
20 November – Opening of the Université Libre de Belgique in Brussels.
17 December – Declarations of reciprocity with the Kingdom of Prussia regarding the inheriting and acquiring of property.
29 December – Extradition treaty with the Kingdom of France comes into force.

Publications
 Journal historique et littéraire begins publication in Liège, owned and edited by Pierre Kersten.
 Pasinomie: collection complète des lois, décrets, arrêtés et réglements généraux qui peuvent être invoqués en Belgique.
 Charles de Brouckère and F. Tielemans, Répertoire de l'administration et du droit administratif de la Belgique, Vols. 1-2 (Brussels, Weissenbruch)
 Maria Doolaeghe, Nederduitsche letteroefeningen
 Zoé de Gamond, De la condition sociale des femmes aux dix-neuvième siècle (Brussels, Berthot)
 A. X. Mauvy, Le Promeneur dans Bruxelles et ses environs (Brussels, Adolphe Wahlen)
 Frances Trollope, Belgium and Western Germany in 1833 (2 vols., Paris, 1834)
 Coralie van den Cruyce, Les orphelins de la grande armée (Brussels)

Births
4 January – Frans de Potter, founder of the Davidsfonds (died 1904)
9 January – Jan Verhas, painter (died 1896)
3 June – Camille van Camp, painter (died 1891)
21 June – Frans de Cort, poet and translator (died 1878)
17 August – Peter Benoit, composer (died 1901)

Deaths

 date uncertain – Élisabeth Delatour (born 1750), painter
 16 May – Louis-Philippe, Crown Prince of Belgium (born 1833)
 27 July – Jean Joseph Delplancq (born 1767), bishop of Tournai

References

 
1830s in Belgium